Charles Moyle (16 April 1884 – 2 August 1952) was an Australian cricketer. He played in two first-class matches for South Australia in 1910/11.

See also
 List of South Australian representative cricketers

References

External links
 

1884 births
1952 deaths
Australian cricketers
South Australia cricketers
Cricketers from Adelaide